William Litton Viner (14 May 1790 – 24 July 1867) was an organist and composer of church music.

Life
Viner was born in Bath; he studied under Charles Wesley junior, and in 1820 became organist of St Michael's Church, Bath. In 1835, on the recommendation of Samuel Sebastian Wesley, he was appointed organist of St Mary's Church, Penzance. Viner continued to be organist at St Mary's until 1859; in that year he went to America.

He died in Westfield, Massachusetts in 1867.

Viner was a prolific composer of church music, organ music, and songs. He was the author of the hymn tunes "Dismissal" and "Helston" (also known as "Kingston").

Works
He edited the following publications:
 One Hundred Psalm and Hymn Tunes in Score (London, 1838)
 A Useful Selection from the most approved Psalms (London, 1846)
 The Chanter's Companion (1857)

References
Viner, William Letton Robert Evans, Maggie Humphreys: Dictionary of Composers for the Church in Great Britain and Ireland. Bloomsbury Publishing 1997.

Attribution

External links
 William L. Viner Collection Sibley Music Library

1790 births
1867 deaths
English classical organists
British male organists
19th-century organists
Classical composers of church music
British emigrants to the United States
Male classical composers
19th-century English musicians
19th-century British male musicians
Male classical organists